Blagodarny is a town and the administrative center of Blagodarnensky District in Stavropol Krai, Russia, located on the Mokraya Buyvola River (Kuma's tributary),  east of Stavropol, the administrative center of the krai. Population:  It was previously known as Blagodarnoye.

History
It was founded in 1782 as the village of Blagodarnoye. It was granted town status in 1971.

Administrative and municipal status
Within the framework of administrative divisions, Blagodarny serves as the administrative center of Blagodarnensky District. As an administrative division, it is incorporated within Blagodarnensky District as the Town of Blagodarny. As a municipal division, the Town of Blagodarny is incorporated within Blagodarnensky Municipal District as Blagodarny Urban Settlement.

References

Notes

Sources

External links
Official website of Blagodarny 
Blagodarny Business Directory 

Cities and towns in Stavropol Krai
Stavropol Governorate
Populated places established in 1782
1782 establishments in the Russian Empire